The Rockin' Chairs were a doo-wop recording group based in Queens Village, New York active in 1958 and 1959.

Discography

Reception
Billboard  described their A Kiss is a Kiss as a "hot record."

When the band played Please Mary Lou on Alan Freed's Big Beat  television show, Freed commented that it sounded like Paul Anka's "Diana."

Billboard  described their Memories of Love recording as having an "overly long intro" and described the recording as "none too good."

All three of their a-side recordings are considered among the top 1000 doo-wop songs of all time.

References

Musical groups established in 1958
Doo-wop groups
Musical groups from Queens, New York
1958 establishments in New York City